Marianus II may refer to:

 Marianus II of Cagliari  (died 1130) 
 Marianus II of Torres (died 1233)
 Marianus II of Arborea (died 1297)